Davao's at-large congressional district may refer to several occasions when a provincewide at-large district was used for elections to the various Philippine national legislatures from the undivided province of Davao.

The Spanish colonial district of Davao, formerly the province of Nueva Guipúzcoa, was represented in the Malolos Congress following its reorganization in 1898 for the National Assembly of the First Philippine Republic. Two representatives from Luzon were appointed by the assembly to represent the province, namely León María Guerrero from Manila and Ceferino Pantoja from Nueva Vizcaya. After the fall of the First Republic, the province was abolished with its territory reverted to a district annexed to Moro Province under U.S. civilian rule in 1903. Moro Province was unrepresented in the Philippine Assembly.

Provincial government was re-established in Davao in 1914 but was not entitled to its own representation in the national legislature. Instead, it remained a part of the larger constituency of the Department of Mindanao and Sulu under the Bureau of Non-Christian Tribes whose representatives were appointed by the Governor General beginning in 1916. In 1934 following the passage of the Tydings–McDuffie Act, Davao elected its own delegate for the first time to the 1934 Philippine Constitutional Convention which was charged with the drafting of a new constitution for the Commonwealth of the Philippines. The province then began to send a representative to the Commonwealth National Assembly from its single-member at-large district created under the 1935 constitution.

Davao was also represented in the Second Republic National Assembly during the Pacific War. It also elected a representative to the restored House of Representatives and to the first six congresses under the Third Philippine Republic. After the 1967 division of Davao, the district was abolished and replaced by Davao del Norte's, Davao del Sur's and Davao Oriental's at-large districts.

Representation history

See also
Legislative districts of Davao del Norte
Legislative districts of Davao del Sur
Legislative districts of Davao Oriental

References

Former congressional districts of the Philippines
Politics of Davao del Norte
Politics of Davao del Sur
Politics of Davao Oriental
1898 establishments in the Philippines
1935 establishments in the Philippines
1968 disestablishments in the Philippines
At-large congressional districts of the Philippines
Congressional districts of the Davao Region
Constituencies established in 1898
Constituencies disestablished in 1901
Constituencies established in 1935
Constituencies disestablished in 1967